Acrobasis betulivorella is a species of snout moth in the genus Acrobasis. It was described by Herbert H. Neunzig in 1975 and is often found in the eastern United States.

The larvae feed on Betula species including Betula nigra.

References

Moths described in 1975
Acrobasis
Moths of North America